The Albany was an American car produced in Albany, Indiana, from 1907 to 1908.

It was produced as a Surrey and a runabout, and was an early vehicle with false hood and solid rubber tires. The single- and 2-cylinder air-cooled motors produced 6/7 hp and 18/20 hp, respectively.

The car was manufactured by a local inventor and businessman, John L. Tulley (1872–1954), who held several turn of the 20th century patents, including a gauge to measure oil. Tulley was a natural mechanic whose early days were spent as a surveyor's assistant. He went on to assist in building power and light plants around the midwest before arriving in Albany to form the Albany Automobile Company in about 1906. The Albany Runabout had two opposing cylinders and was air-cooled. Up to 850 cars were said to have been built and they were shipped to all parts of the country, with at least one vehicle shipped to England.

Marketed as "the busy man's car", one of the Albany's main selling points was blue dyed elephant hide seats, which were supposedly guaranteed to last the lifetime of the car.

References
^ G. Marshall Naul, "Albany", in G.N. Georgano, ed., The Complete Encyclopedia of Motorcars 1885-1968  (New York: E.P. Dutton and Co., 1974), pp. 31.

External links
1907 Albany runabout

Defunct motor vehicle manufacturers of the United States
Motor vehicle manufacturers based in Indiana
Defunct companies based in Indiana